Cayetano "Tano" Bartolomé Bonnín Vásquez (born 30 June 1990) is a professional footballer who plays as a central defender for Italian  club Vibonese. Born in Spain, he represents the Dominican Republic national team.

Club career
Born in Palma de Mallorca, Balearic Islands, Bonnín spent almost all of his youth football with local RCD Mallorca, his two spells with the club totalling 11 years. He made his senior debut with the reserves in the Segunda División B, finishing the 2009–10 season on loan to fellow league side Real Jaén.

Bonnín signed with Real Madrid in the summer of 2010, being initially assigned to the B team but only representing the third side in the Tercera División. He continued playing in the Spanish lower leagues the following years, with Valencia CF Mestalla.

In February 2013, Bonnín became an internet sensation after clearing the ball with a bicycle kick against CE L'Hospitalet for the third division. On 3 September he joined SD Noja, but moved to Villarreal CF C on 25 October after being not allowed to play.

On 8 July 2015, Bonnín joined CA Osasuna of Segunda División. He made his debut for the club on 30 August, coming on as a 46th-minute substitute for Miguel Flaño in a 1–0 home win against CD Mirandés, and contributed 30 appearances – play-offs included – to help his team achieve promotion.

Bonnín first appeared in La Liga on 10 September 2016, starting and being sent off in a 5–2 loss at former side Real Madrid. The following 11 January, in the first minutes of the return match against the same opponent, he broke the fibula and tibia to his right leg after an unlucky challenge by Isco; he made his comeback on 10 December that year, as a late replacement in a 1–0 defeat away to Real Oviedo.

In August 2018, at the end of his contract with Osasuna, Bonnín signed for Lleida Esportiu for the upcoming third-tier campaign. On 11 June of the following year, he moved to UD Almería one league above after agreeing to a two-year contract. He was one of several new signings discarded by incoming manager Pedro Emanuel on 30 August, and resumed his career the following month on a deal of equal duration at FC Rapid București in Romania's Liga II.

Bonnín returned to Spain in September 2020, joining Hércules CF on a one-year deal with the option of one more. He was released when that option was not taken for financial reasons, but later agreed to an identical contract with the Segunda División RFEF club.

International career
Born to a Dominican mother, Bonnín made his international debut for the Dominican Republic national team on 24 March 2013, appearing in a 3–1 friendly win with Haiti. On 22 March 2018, in his first international match since his leg injury, he captained the nation in a 4–0 friendly victory over the Turks & Caicos Islands in Santo Domingo.

Bonnín scored his first international goal on 12 October 2018, by opening a 3–0 defeat of the Cayman Islands in CONCACAF Nations League qualifying.

International goals
 (Dominican Republic score listed first, score column indicates score after each Bonnín goal)

References

External links

Fútbol Dominicano profile 

1990 births
Living people
Spanish people of Dominican Republic descent
Dominican Republic people of Spanish descent
Citizens of the Dominican Republic through descent
Sportspeople of Dominican Republic descent
Footballers from Palma de Mallorca
Spanish footballers
Dominican Republic footballers
Association football defenders
La Liga players
Segunda División players
Segunda División B players
Tercera División players
RCD Mallorca B players
Real Jaén footballers
Real Madrid C footballers
Valencia CF Mestalla footballers
Villarreal CF C players
Villarreal CF B players
CA Osasuna players
Lleida Esportiu footballers
UD Almería players
Hércules CF players
Liga II players
FC Rapid București players
U.S. Vibonese Calcio players
Serie D players
Dominican Republic international footballers
Spanish expatriate footballers
Dominican Republic expatriate footballers
Expatriate footballers in Spain
Expatriate footballers in Romania
Expatriate footballers in Italy
Spanish expatriate sportspeople in Romania
Dominican Republic expatriate sportspeople in Spain
Dominican Republic expatriate sportspeople in Romania
Dominican Republic expatriate sportspeople in Italy